Cornelia Thomas (born 28 June 1960) is a Swiss cross-country skier. She competed in two events at the 1980 Winter Olympics.

Cross-country skiing results
All results are sourced from the International Ski Federation (FIS).

Olympic Games

World Cup

Season standings

References

External links

1960 births
Living people
Swiss female cross-country skiers
Olympic cross-country skiers of Switzerland
Cross-country skiers at the 1980 Winter Olympics
Place of birth missing (living people)
20th-century Swiss women